Leucoptera zanclaeella is a moth in the family Lyonetiidae. It is found in Sicily, Dalmatia and France.

The larvae feed on Cytisus villosus. They probably mine the leaves of their host plant.

External links
bladmineerders.nl
Fauna Europaea

Leucoptera (moth)
Moths of Europe